ELHS may refer to:
 East Lansing High School, East Lansing, Michigan, United States
 East Laurens High School, East Dublin, Georgia, United States
 East Lincoln High School, Denver, North Carolina, United States
 East Liverpool High School, East Liverpool, Ohio, United States
 East Lyme High School, East Lyme, Connecticut, United States
 Edward Little High School, Auburn, Maine, United States
East Longmeadow High School, East Longmeadow, Massachusetts, United States
 Evergreen Lutheran High School, Des Moines, Washington, United States